James Stringer (1879–1933) was an English footballer who played in the Football League for West Bromwich Albion and Wolverhampton Wanderers.

References

1879 births
1933 deaths
English footballers
Association football goalkeepers
English Football League players
Wolverhampton Wanderers F.C. players
West Bromwich Albion F.C. players
Dudley Town F.C. players